The 1993 season in Swedish football, starting January 1993 and ending December 1993:

Honours

Official titles

Competitions

Promotions, relegations and qualifications

Promotions

Relegations

International qualifications

Domestic results

Allsvenskan 1993

Allsvenskan qualification play-off 1993

Division 1 Norra 1993

Division 1 Södra 1993

Division 1 qualification play-off 1993 
1st round

2nd round

Svenska Cupen 1992–93 
Final

National team results

Notes

References 
Print

Online

 
Seasons in Swedish football